Silver St. Cloud is a fictional character appearing in American comic books published by DC Comics, commonly in association with the vigilante Batman. The character debuted in Detective Comics #470 (June 1977) and was created by Steve Englehart and Walt Simonson. Silver St. Cloud is typically depicted as a romantic interest of Bruce Wayne.

The character appeared on the second season of Gotham and was played by Natalie Alyn Lind.

Publication history
Created by Steve Englehart and Walt Simonson, Silver St. Cloud debuted in Detective Comics #470 (February 1978). The issues featuring her earlier appearances have been collected in trade paperback form as Batman: Strange Apparitions.

Fictional character biography
St. Cloud is a socialite residing in Gotham City, hosting parties for the rich and influential. She later becomes a successful event planner outside Gotham.

Detective Comics debut (Batman: Strange Apparitions)
Silver St. Cloud is Bruce Wayne's love interest in stories from Detective Comics #469–476, 478 and 479, later reprinted as a trade paperback collection of those stories titled Batman: Strange Apparitions. St. Cloud first meets Bruce Wayne following the Batman's defeat of new villain Doctor Phosphorus in a battle that occurred at a nuclear power plant on the ocean. She soon begins dating Bruce Wayne. She suspects from the start that Bruce is hiding something, citing his interest in crime reports and his encounters with Batman as evidence of a secret. When Bruce Wayne is captured and replaced by Hugo Strange in a prosthetic disguise, Silver quickly notices Wayne is not acting like himself and contacts Dick Grayson (Robin) to tell him about Wayne's strange behavior. Her insight and quick action leads to Robin rescuing Bruce.

Silver is one of the few characters to have discovered Batman's secret identity. Her relationship with Bruce was initially in trouble due to his repeated disappearances. However, over the time she was able to piece together the clues and eventually recognize her lover in the Batman costume. Silver confirms her suspicions by calling out to Bruce while he battled the villain Deadshot, causing him to turn and allowing Silver to recognize Batman's chin as the chin of Bruce Wayne. The initial appearances of Silver also represent the first time that it is explicitly recognized that Bruce Wayne or even Batman has engaged in a sexual relationship.

Silver witnesses Batman fighting the Joker. After defeating the Joker, Batman meets with Silver. She reveals to Batman that she knows his secret and that she still loves him. She says that she could not be with him because she could not stand worrying about him each night. She then ends the relationship, asking him not to see her again.

Silver's breakup with Bruce has repercussions in the following issues, where Batman takes out his frustration over the failed relationship on a couple of criminals. Most of his fury becomes concentrated on one criminal, whom he punches repeatedly. Bruce tells Alfred Pennyworth that he blames his crimefighting persona for driving Silver away, and for a time muses whether he should give up being Batman forever.

Siege
In the Legends of the Dark Knight story arc "Siege" (plotted by Archie Goodwin), St. Cloud briefly returns to Bruce Wayne's life while organizing a mercenaries' convention in Gotham, but is severely injured by the convention's leader when she discovers a plot to assault the city.

Batman: Dark Detective
Silver returns once again in Steve Englehart's story arc Batman: Dark Detective, a sequel to Batman: Strange Apparitions. In this series, her relationship with Bruce Wayne evolves further, to the point that Silver prepares to leave her fiancé, a campaigning senator, to be with him, but her fiancé's arm and leg are cut off in the Joker's booby traps while he attempts to find her in the Joker's house. Wayne instructs her to continue her relationship with the senator until his campaign ends, but she is angered by this and leaves Wayne's life again.

Steve Englehart has written another chapter to his trilogy to resolve it, but DC has declined to publish the story.

Batman: The Widening Gyre
Her character returns in Kevin Smith's Batman: The Widening Gyre, in which she and Bruce rekindle their romance on an island beach that her family owns. At the end of the comic, her throat is slashed by the villain Onomatopoeia.

Batman/Elmer Fudd Special
During Rebirth, Silver St. Cloud became the lover of Elmer Fudd from Looney Tunes after her breakup with Bruce Wayne. When she finds out that Elmer is a bounty hunter, she fakes her death at the hands of hitman Bugs "the Bunny". This sends Elmer into a depression and he attempts to kill Bugs and later Bruce Wayne for her death. When Elmer tells Batman his story, the two arrive at Porky's bar to confront Bugs, only for Silver to reveal herself, that she left Bruce Wayne for his dangerous lifestyle, and fell in love with Elmer for being safe and secure until he told her he was dangerous too. She explains she faked her death to escape from Elmer and told Bugs to send Fudd to Bruce Wayne if Elmer ever came after him since they had so much in common that they'd find something to do together.

Reception
The character was ranked 64th in Comics Buyer's Guide's "100 Sexiest Women in Comics" list.

In other media

Television
 Silver St. Cloud appears in Season 2 of Gotham, portrayed by Natalie Alyn Lind. This version is the step-niece and ward of corrupt billionaire Theo Galavan and his sister Tabitha Galavan. She befriends the young Bruce Wayne who is immediately smitten with her. Unbeknownst to Bruce, Silver is helping Galavan with the Order of St. Dumas' plan to kill Bruce and take over Wayne Enterprises. To that end, she starts dating Bruce while driving a wedge between the latter and Selina Kyle who sees through her act. Bruce and Silver are abducted outside Anders Preparatory Academy by hitman Tom "The Knife". When The Knife threatens her with torture, Silver says that someone is connected to the murders of Thomas Wayne and Martha Wayne. It is then revealed that Selina and Bruce hired The Knife to get information out of her. Galavan tasks her with luring Bruce to an arranged death, but she has by now developed genuine feelings for Bruce and instead helps him escape the clutches of her uncle and the Order of St. Dumas' planned sacrifice when Jim Gordon leads a rescue party. After Tabitha turns against Theo during the fight between the Order of St. Dumas and Oswald Cobblepot's group, Tabitha escapes out the window with Silver where they parachuted to the streets below.

Film
 Silver St. Cloud was set to appear in the original script for the 1989 film Batman, written by Tom Mankiewicz, as Bruce Wayne's love interest and underling of crime boss Rupert Thorne.
 Silver St. Cloud has a small role in the animated film Batman: Soul of the Dragon, voiced by Erica Luttrell. She breaks up her relationship with Bruce Wayne when the latter refuses to share all personal secrets (particularly his Batman identity) with her.

Web series
 Silver St. Cloud appears in the web series DC Super Hero Girls, voiced by Grey Griffin.

References

External links
 Silver St. Cloud at DC Comics Wiki
 
 Silver St. Cloud at Comic Vine
 Silver St. Cloud on IMDb

Characters created by Steve Englehart
Characters created by Walt Simonson
Comics characters introduced in 1977
DC Comics female characters
Fictional socialites